Babu Bharadwaj (1948–2016) was a Malayalam–language writer and journalist from Kerala, India.

Life
Born in Chemancheri, Calicut as the son of M. R. Vijayaraghavan and K. P. Bhavani, Bharadwaj studied at Poyilkavu High School and Malabar Christian College, Calicut and Government Engineering College, Trichur. He was actively involved in student politics and was the first national joint secretary of Students' Federation of India (SFI).

Bharadwaj started his journalistic career with the left-leaning Malayalam magazine Chintha. He also worked for the television media; he was the Programme Head for MediaOne TV and Creative Executive for Kairali TV. In 2006, he founded the Malayalam online news portal DoolNews. 

A civil engineer by profession, he worked in Saudi Arabia for a long time and many of his literary works focused on the lives of Indian expatriates in the Persian Gulf region. He won the Kerala Sahitya Akademi Award for Novel for Kalapangalkkoru Grihapadam (2006). His other works include Pravasiyude Kurippukal, Shavaghoshayathra, Puppet Theatre, Pravasiyude Vazhiyambalangal, Panchakalyani and Adrushya Nagarangal. He also produced the Malayalam film Iniyum Marichittillatha Nammal (1980) directed by Chintha Ravi. 

He died on 30 March 2016 of heart-related ailments.

References

People from Kozhikode district
1948 births
2016 deaths
Malayali people
21st-century Indian male writers
21st-century Indian novelists
Indian male novelists
Writers from Kozhikode
Novelists from Kerala
Malayalam-language writers
Malayalam novelists
Journalists from Kerala
Indian male journalists
Malayalam-language journalists
Recipients of the Kerala Sahitya Akademi Award
Indian male television journalists